Yeji District is a district of the city of Lu'an, Anhui Province, People's Republic of China, bordering Henan province to the west. The government of Yeji District is located in Yeji Town. Yeji District was established from parts of Huoqiu County of two towns (Yeji and Sanyuan) and one township (Sungang).

Administrative divisions
Yeji District has jurisdiction to 2 towns and 1 townships.
2 Towns
 Yeji
 Sanyuan

1 Townships
 Sungang

References

County-level divisions of Anhui
Lu'an